Gambhir River may refer to:
 Gambhir River, Madhya Pradesh
 Gambhir River, Rajasthan